Oskar Birger Ferdinand Stenman (23 December 1925 in Solna, Sweden — 20 May 1970 in Hägersten, Sweden) was a Swedish footballer who played as a midfielder. He made 119 Allsvenskan appearances for Djurgårdens IF and scored eleven goals.

References

1925 births
1970 deaths
Association football midfielders
Swedish footballers
Sweden international footballers
Allsvenskan players
Djurgårdens IF Fotboll players